Relindellidae is a family of radiolarians in the order Spumellaria.

References

External links 
 

Polycystines
Radiolarian families